Joseph Przybylski was a member of the Wisconsin State Assembly.

Biography
Przybylski was born on June 9, 1897 in Milwaukee, Wisconsin. He graduated from South Division High School before attending the University of Wisconsin Extension and Marquette University.

Career
Przybylski was elected as a Republican to the Assembly in 1928, defeating incumbent George L. Tews. In 1932, he was defeated for re-election as a Democrat by John Ermenc.

References

Politicians from Milwaukee
Members of the Wisconsin State Assembly
Wisconsin Republicans
Wisconsin Democrats
Marquette University alumni
1897 births
Year of death missing
South Division High School alumni